In Greek mythology, Ecbasus (Ancient Greek: Έκβασος) was an Argive prince as the son of King Argus, son of Zeus and Niobe, daughter of Phoroneus. 

Ecbasus mother was either Evadne, daughter of the river-god Strymon or the Oceanid Peitho while Criasus, Iasus, Peiranthus, Epidaurus and Tiryns were listed as his brothers. Criasus succeeded their father to the throne of Argos. Ecbasus was the father of Agenor, the father of Argus Panoptes who guards Io. In some accounts, he fathered Arestor who became the father of Pelasgus, father of Lycaon of Arcadia.

Notes 

Princes in Greek mythology
Inachids
Mythology of Argos

References 

 Apollodorus, The Library with an English Translation by Sir James George Frazer, F.B.A., F.R.S. in 2 Volumes, Cambridge, MA, Harvard University Press; London, William Heinemann Ltd. 1921. ISBN 0-674-99135-4. Online version at the Perseus Digital Library. Greek text available from the same website.
 Gaius Julius Hyginus, Fabulae from The Myths of Hyginus translated and edited by Mary Grant. University of Kansas Publications in Humanistic Studies. Online version at the Topos Text Project.
 Stephanus of Byzantium, Stephani Byzantii Ethnicorum quae supersunt, edited by August Meineike (1790-1870), published 1849. A few entries from this important ancient handbook of place names have been translated by Brady Kiesling. Online version at the Topos Text Project.